This is a list of public art in San Francisco.  This list applies only to works of public art accessible in an outdoor public space. For example, this does not include artwork visible inside a museum.

Most of the works mentioned are sculptures. When this is not the case (i.e. sound installation, for example) it is stated next to the title.

Balboa Park

Civic Center

Chinatown

Embarcadero

Financial District

Fisherman's Wharf

Forest Hill, San Francisco

Golden Gate Park

Hayes Valley

Inner Sunset

Lake Merced

Lincoln Park

Mission District

Nob Hill

Noe Valley

North Beach

Parkmerced

Richmond District

Rincon Hill

San Francisco State University

SoMA

Tenderloin

Union Square

University of San Francisco

References

Public art
Lists of public art in California
Public art
San Francisco
San Francisco-related lists